Manakondur is a village in Manakondur mandal of Karimnagar district of the Indian state of Telangana.

References 

Villages in Karimnagar district
Mandal headquarters in Karimnagar district